Armand Gega (born 21 January 1987) is an Albanian football player. The midfielder currently plays for Shënkolli.

External links
 

1987 births
Living people
Sportspeople from Fier
Albanian footballers
Association football midfielders
KF Apolonia Fier players
KF Bylis Ballsh players
KF Himara players
FK Tomori Berat players
KF Butrinti players
KF Shënkolli players